Allandale is a rural locality in the Scenic Rim Region, Queensland, Australia.

Geography 
There are no major roads in Allandale.

Teviot Brook flows through the north of Allandale.  Some of the land is used for agricultural purposes.  The southeast portion is hilly, undeveloped and mostly cleared of natural vegetation.  This catchment area is separate from the Teviot Brook watershed, with run-off flowing in to Allan Creek, a tributary of the Logan River to the east.

History 
Allandale State School opened on 27 February 1928. It closed on 24 March 1963. It was located near the intersection of Radcliffe/Geiger Road and Hutchinson Road.

The locality contained 33 households, in which 60.0% of the population are males and 40.0% of the population are females with a median age of 53, 15 years above the national average. The average weekly household income is $850, $588 below the national average.

References

External links

Scenic Rim Region
Localities in Queensland